Miodrag Andrić (28 January 1943 – 22 January 1989), commonly known by his nickname Ljuba Moljac (Ljuba The moth), was a Serbian actor. He appeared in more than sixty films from 1963 to 1989.

Selected filmography

References

External links 

1943 births
1989 deaths
Actors from Kragujevac
Serbian male film actors